"If This World Were Mine" is a 1967 song by soul music duo Marvin Gaye and Tammi Terrell from their album United. Written solely by Gaye, it was one of the few songs they recorded without Ashford & Simpson writing or producing. When it was released as a single in November 1967 as the B-side to the duo's "If I Could Build My Whole World Around You", it hit the Billboard pop singles chart, peaking at number sixty-eight, and peaked at number twenty-seven on the Billboard R&B singles chart. Gaye would later put the song into his set list during his last tours in the early-1980s as he performed a medley of his hits with Terrell. The song was covered a year later by Joe Bataan on the 1968 Fania Allstars LP Live at the Red Garter, Vol. 2, and in 1969 by Ambrose Slade (pre-Slade) on their album Beginnings.

Charts

Cover versions

Luther Vandross and Cheryl Lynn version 

Fifteen years after the original recording, Luther Vandross and Cheryl Lynn re-recorded it for her album Instant Love and made the song a R&B top five smash peaking at number four in 1982 on the Billboard Hot R&B Singles chart.

Charts

Other versions
A decade later, Coko of SWV and rising R&B singer Tyrese recorded it for her 1999 solo album Hot Coko. The song is featured on John Legend's 2004 live album Solo Sessions Vol. 1: Live at the Knitting Factory, with Imani Uzuri singing the female lead.

In 2005, Alicia Keys and Jermaine Paul recorded it for the Luther Vandross tribute album So Amazing: An All-Star Tribute to Luther Vandross. The song was nominated Best R&B Performance by a Duo or Group with Vocals at the Grammy Awards. They did not win; instead, the Grammy was awarded to Beyoncé Knowles and Stevie Wonder for their cover "So Amazing," which appeared on the same Vandross tribute album.

In 1973, Jerry Butler and Brenda Lee Eager recorded the song on their album The Love We Have, the Love We Had.

Sampling
R&B singer Tweet sampled the Gaye/Terrell original for the intro of her 2005 single "Turn Da Lights Off", featuring Missy Elliott. 

In 2013, American house music producer Chris Malinchak sampled the song on "So Good to Me".

References

1967 singles
1967 songs
1982 singles
Alicia Keys songs
Cheryl Lynn songs
Columbia Records singles
John Legend songs
Luther Vandross songs
Male–female vocal duets
Marvin Gaye songs
Slade songs
Song recordings produced by Harvey Fuqua
Song recordings produced by Johnny Bristol
Song recordings produced by Luther Vandross
Song recordings produced by Marcus Miller
Songs written by Marvin Gaye
Tamla Records singles
Tammi Terrell songs